Alive in Oslo (fully titled The Day of Total Armageddon Holocaust – Alive in Oslo) is a live album by Australian unblack metal band Horde, released by Veridon Music in April 2007. The album features a live concert by the band, recorded at Nordic Fest in Oslo, Norway on 3 November 2006, during which nearly all the band's songs were performed except for "Drink From the Chalice of Blood," "Weak, Feeble, Dying Antichrist," and "Mine Heart Doth Beseech Thee (O Master)." It also features a bonus DVD of the same name containing video footage of the show. Three songs from the live album later appeared as bonus tracks on the remastered version of Horde's only studio album, Hellig Usvart (1994), released by Metal Mind Productions in May 2008.

Track listing
All songs written by Anonymous (Jayson Sherlock).

live recording appears on the 2008 remaster of Hellig Usvart

Personnel
Anonymous (aka Jayson Sherlock) – vocals, drums
Bøddel – lead guitar, rhythm guitar
Gestalt – bass guitar
Kvest – rhythm guitar
Simon "Pilgrim" Rosen (of Crimson Moonlight) – guest vocals on "Invert the Inverted Cross"

Production
Jayson Sherlock – design, layout, logo
Thomas Thunder – mixing
Brad K – sound recording

Horde (band) albums
2007 live albums